The Open Mind was an English psychedelic rock band formed in London, and active in the 1960s and 1970s.

Overview
The band was formed in 1963 by four musicians from Putney, South West London.  Initially named The Apaches and formed by Tim du Feu, Mike Brancaccio and Philip Fox and their friend Ray Nye. Nye left in 1965 and another friend, Terry Schindler, joined instead. The band became The Drag Set, who released a little-known single in February 1967, "Day and Night" / "Get Out of My Way".  Shortly thereafter, they changed their name to The Open Mind and in July 1969 released a self-titled LP which has since become a highly sought-after collectible.  The band, however, is best known for its druggy August 1969 single, "Magic Potion", which did not appear on the album.

The Open Mind disbanded in 1973; its members wanted to move into jazz-influenced music, but The Open Mind was too well known as a psychedelic band.  The band members (minus Phil Fox) went on to form Armada, which lasted about three years but did not release any recorded material.

Despite their paucity of recorded material, The Open Mind have proven to be influential in the psychedelic rock genre, their single "Magic Potion" having been covered by bands such as The Seers, Sun Dial and The Damned.

Band members
Mike Bran, a.k.a. Mike Brancaccio - lead guitar, vocals, piano (born 17 April 1946, Rome, Italy)
Timothy du Feu - bass guitar(born 31 May 1944, Malvern, Worcestershire, England)
Philip Fox - drums (born 26 August 1946, Westminster, South West London)
Ray Nye - guitar, vocals
Terry Martin, a.k.a. Terry Schindler - guitar, vocals (born 26 August 1945, Holborn, West Central London)

Discography

Singles
"Horses and Chariots" b/w "Before My Time" (Philips BF 1790) May, 1969
"Magic Potion" b/w "Cast a Spell" (Philips BF 1805) August, 1969
The Drag Set
"Day and Night" b/w "Get Out of My Way" 7" single (Go AJ 11405) May, 1967

Album
The Open Mind LP (Philips 7893) (July 1969)

The Open Mind was reissued on CD on the Acme Records and Second Battle labels.  The two non-LP songs from the single are included as bonus tracks.

References

External links

[ Allmusic entry for the Open Mind]
June 2001 interview with bassist Timothy du Feu

English psychedelic rock music groups
Musical groups from London
Musical groups established in 1968
Musical groups disestablished in 1973